Olsynium is a genus of summer-dormant rhizomatous perennial flowering plants in the iris family Iridaceae, native to sunny hillsides in South America and western North America.

Description

Flowers are bell-shaped, with six white, pink, or lilac tepals, and bloom from late winter to spring.

Etymology
The genus name is derived from the Greek words ol, meaning "a little", and syn-, meaning "joined", referring to the stamens.

Taxonomy
The taxon Olsynium was formerly considered as part of the genus Sisyrinchium. The following species are recognised in the genus Olsynium:
 Olsynium acaule (Klatt) Goldblatt - Peru, Bolivia, northwestern Argentina
 Olsynium andinum (Phil.) Ravenna - central Chile, Neuquén Province in Argentina
 Olsynium biflorum (Thunb.) Goldblatt - Santa Cruz + Tierra del Fuego Provinces in southern Argentina
 Olsynium bodenbenderi (Kurtz) Goldblatt - Mendoza Province in Argentina
 Olsynium chrysochromum J.M.Watson & A.R.Flores - central Chile
 Olsynium douglasii (A.Dietr.) E.P.Bicknell - British Columbia, Washington, Oregon, extreme northern California, Idaho, northern Nevada, northwestern Utah
 Olsynium filifolium (Gaudich.) Goldblatt - southern Argentina, Falkland Islands
 Olsynium junceum (E.Mey. ex C.Presl) Goldblatt - Bolivia, Argentina, Chile
 Olsynium lyckholmii (Dusén) Goldblatt - central Chile, southern Argentina
 Olsynium nigricans (Phil.) R.A.Rodr. & Martic. - Maule Province in Chile
 Olsynium obscurum (Cav.) Goldblatt - southern Chile, Tierra del Fuego Province in Argentina
 Olsynium philippii (Klatt) Goldblatt - central Chile
 Olsynium porphyreum (Kraenzl.) Ravenna - Peru
 Olsynium scirpoideum (Poepp.) Goldblatt - central + northern Chile, Rio Negro Province in Argentina
 Olsynium stoloniferum Ravenna - O'Higgins Province in Chile
 Olsynium trinerve (Baker) R.A.Rodr. & Martic. - Costa Rica, Venezuela, Colombia, Ecuador, Peru, Bolivia, northern Chile 
 Olsynium villosum Ravenna - Santiago Province in Chile

References

External links
 Flora of North America
 Pacific Bulb Society
 Huxley, A., ed. (1992). New RHS Dictionary of Gardening. Macmillan.

Sisyrinchieae
Iridaceae genera
Taxa named by Constantine Samuel Rafinesque